Marcos Hernández may refer to:

Marcos Hernández (swimmer) (born 1978), Cuban former freestyle swimmer
Marcos Hernandez (singer) (born 1982), American singer